Told by the Dead is a collection of horror stories by British writer Ramsey Campbell, published by PS Publishing in 2003. The first edition contains a foreword by Poppy Z. Brite and an afterword by the author. It won the 2004 British Fantasy Award for best collection. 

The stories included are:

 "Return Journey" (2000)
 "Twice by Fire" (1998)
 "Agatha's Ghost" (1999)
 "Little Ones" (1999)
 "The Last Hand" (1975)
 "Facing It" (1995)
 "Never to be Heard" (1998)
 "The Previous Tenant" (1975)
 "Becoming Visible" (1999)
 "No End of Fun" (2002)
 "After the Queen" (1977)
 "Tatters" (2001)
 "Accident Zone" (1995)
 "The Entertainment" (1999)
 "Dead Letters" (1978)
 "All for Sale" (2001)
 "No Strings" (2000)
 "The Worst Fog of the Year" (1990)
 "The Retrospective" (2002)
 "Slow" (1985)
 "Worse than Bones" (2001)
 "No Story In It" (2000)
 "The Word" (1997)

2003 short story collections
Fantasy short story collections
Horror short story collections
PS Publishing books